Mike Corren (born 28 February 1974 in Millicent) is a professional squash player who represented Australia. He reached a career-high world ranking of World No. 38 in February 2004.

References

External links 
 
 
 

Australian male squash players
Living people
1974 births
People from Millicent, South Australia
Sportsmen from South Australia